This is a list of notable hospitals in India. 

Various medical colleges and medicine related educational institutes also serve as hospitals. For those, refer List of medical colleges in India. For a list of psychiatric hospitals and nursing homes in India refer List of psychiatric hospitals in India.

Chain hospitals 
Various chain or network hospitals operate in various cities of India. These are:
 Apollo Hospitals
 Asian Institute of Medical Sciences
 Aster DM Healthcare
 Billroth Hospitals
 Care Hospitals
 Command Hospital
 Council of Christian Hospitals
 Dr. Agarwal's Eye Hospital
 Dr. Mohan's Diabetes Specialities Centre
 Fortis Healthcare
 Global Hospitals Group
 Health Care Global
 Hinduja Healthcare Limited
 Krishna Institute of Medical Sciences
 L. V. Prasad Eye Institutes
 LifeSpring Hospitals
 Max Healthcare
 Manipal Hospitals
 Medica Hospitals
 Metro Group of Hospitals
 Narayana Health
 Paras Healthcare
 Park Group of Hospitals
 Regional Cancer Centre
 Sahyadri Hospital
 Shalby Hospital
 Sir Jamshetjee Jeejebhoy Group of Hospitals
 Sterling Hospitals
 Vasan Healthcare
 Wockhardt Hospitals

Andhra Pradesh

Anantapuram 
 Sri Sathya Sai Institute of Higher Medical Sciences, Puttaparthi

Tirupati 
 Sri Venkateswara Institute of Medical Sciences (SVIMS)

Vijayawada 
 Krishna Institute of Medical Sciences
 L. V. Prasad Eye Institute
 Siddhartha Medical College, NTR University of Health Sciences
 Rainbow Hospitals
 Dr. Mohan’s Diabetes Specialities Centre

Visakhapatnam 

 Apollo Hospitals, Visakhapatnam
 Care Hospitals
 Government ENT Hospital, Visakhapatnam
 Government Regional Eye Hospital
 Government TB and Chest Hospital, Visakhapatnam
 Government Victoria Hospital
 Homi Bhabha Cancer Hospital & Research Centre
 Krishna Institute of Medical Sciences
 King George Hospital
 L. V. Prasad Eye Institute
 Rainbow Hospitals
 Rani Chandramani Devi Government Hospital
 SevenHills Hospital
 Visakha Institute of Medical Sciences

Assam

Guwahati 
 Gauhati Medical College and Hospital
 Dr. B. Borooah Cancer Institute
 GNRC
Narayana Superspeciality Hospital
Apollo Hospitals

Dibrugarh 
 Assam Medical College

Silchar 
 SMCH – Silchar Medical College and Hospital

Jorhat 
 Jorhat Medical College and Hospital
 Medical Institute Jorhat

Tezpur 
 Tezpur Medical College and Hospital
Lokopriya Gopinath Bordoloi Regional Institute of Mental Health

Diphu 
 Diphu Medical College and Hospital

Barpeta 
 Fakhruddin Ali Ahmed Medical College and Hospital

Bihar

Bhagalpur 
 Jawaharlal Nehru Medical College and Hospital

Darbhanga 
 Darbhanga Medical College and Hospital
 Mithila Minority Dental College and Hospital

Bettiah 
 Government Medical College and MJK Hospital

Gaya 
 Anugrah Narayan Magadh Medical College and Hospital

Katihar 
 Katihar Medical College

Muzaffarpur 
 Sri Krishna Medical College

Patna 
 AIIMS Patna
 Mediversal Hospital
 Ford Hospital and Research Centre
 Guru Gobind Singh Hospital, Patna Sahib
 Indira Gandhi Institute of Medical Sciences (IGIMS)
 Mahavir Cancer Institute and Research Centre
 Nalanda Medical College Hospital, Kankarbagh
 Patna Medical College Hospital, Ashok Raj Patna

Sasaram 
 Narayan Medical College and Hospital

Chandigarh 
 Post Graduate Institute of Medical Education and Research, Sector 12

Delhi

Goa 
Institute of Psychiatry and Human Behaviour

Gujarat

Ahmedabad 
 Ahmedabad Civil Hospital
 B.J. Medical College, Asarwa
 GCRI, Ahmedabad
 Shalby Hospital

Amreli 
 Shantabaa Medical College Hospital, Amreli

Baroda 
 Baroda Medical College Hospitals at M S University

Bhavnagar 
 Government Medical College Hospital Bhavnagar

Jamnagar 
 Irwin Group of Hospitals renamed as Guru Gobind Singh Hospital at M. P. Shah Medical College

Junagadh 
 GMERS Medical College and Hospital, Junagadh

Rajkot 
 All India Institute of Medical Sciences, Rajkot & Pandit Deendayal Upadhyay Medical College Hospital, Rajkot

Surat 
 Smimer Hospital

Nadiad 
 Muljibhai Patel Urological Hospital

Haryana

Faridabad 

 Asian Institute of Medical Sciences
 Fortis Escorts Hospital
 Metro Hospital
 Park Hospital

Gurugram 
 Artemis Hospital
 Fortis Memorial Research Institute
 Manipal Hospitals (formerly known as Columbia Asia)
 Max Hospital
 Medanta - The Medicity
 Narayana Superspeciality Hospital
 Paras Hospitals
 Park Hospital
 The Signature Hospital

Hisar 
 Ganga Ram Hospital

Himachal Pradesh

Shimla 

 Indira Gandhi Medical College and Hospital, Shimla (Snowdown Hospital)
 Deendayal Upadhyaya Hospital, Shimla (Ripon Hospital)

Others 

 Dr. Rajendra Prasad Government Medical College Kangra
Shri Lal Bahadur Shastri Government Medical College and Hospital, Mandi

Jharkhand

Karnataka

Bengaluru 
 Apollo Hospitals
 Bangalore Medical College
 Bowring & Lady Curzon Hospitals
 Bangalore Medical College
 Columbia Asia, Hebbal
 Columbia Asia, Yeshwanthpur
 Dr. Mohan’s Diabetes Specialities Centre
 Indira Gandhi Institute of Child Health, Bangalore
 Minto Eye Hospital, Bangalore Medical College
 Kidwai Memorial Institute of Oncology
 Narayana Hrudayalaya, Hosur Road
 National Institute of Mental Health and Neurosciences (Nimhans), Bangalore
 Nethradhama Superspeciality Eye Hospital, Jayanagar
 Rajarajeswari Medical College and Hospital
 SDS Tuberculosis and Rajiv Gandhi Institute of Chest diseases
 Sri Jayadeva Institute of Cardiology, Jayanagar
 St. Johns Medical College
 Vanivilas Women and Children Hospital, Bangalore Medical College
 Victoria Hospital, Bangalore Medical College
 Vydehi Institute of Medical Sciences and Research Centre Whitefield, Bangalore
 Basaveshwara Teaching and General Hospital, Gulbarga

Gulbarga
 Sri Jayadeva Institute of Cardiology, Sedam road

Mysore 
 All India Institute of Speech and Hearing [AIISH],  Manasagangotri
 Krishna Rajendra Hospital
 Cheluvamba Hospital
 Narayana Multispeciality Hospital
 Columbia Asia, Belvadi
 Dr. Mohan’s Diabetes Specialities Centre

Mangalore 
 A J Institute of Medical Science

Manipal 
 Kasturba Medical College

Kerala

Alappuzha 
 Government T D Medical College, Alappuzha

Kozhikode (Calicut) 
 Government Medical College, Kozhikode
 Aster MIMS
 The Cradle Hospital Calicut
 Chest Hospital

Kochi 
 Amrita Institute of Medical Sciences
 Aster Medcity
 General Hospital, Ernakulam
 Indira Gandhi Cooperative Hospital
 Lakeshore Hospital
 Lisie Hospital
 Little Flower Hospital
 Medical Trust Hospital
 Rajagiri Hospital
 Renai medicity
 Saraf Hospital
 Sunrise Hospital

Kollam 
 Azeezia Medical College, Meeyannoor, Kollam
 Employee's State Insurance Hospital & Medical College
 N. S. Memorial Institute of Medical Sciences
 Travancore Medical College Hospital

Kottayam 
 Medical College Hospital, Athirumpuzha
 St. Thomas Hospital, Chethipuzha, Changanacherry

Kozhikode 
 Malabar Institute of Medical Sciences (MIMS)
 Medical College Hospital

Palakkad
 Seventh-day Adventist Hospital, Kanniampuram, Ottapalam

Thiruvananthapuram 
 Sree Chitra Thirunal Institute of Medical Sciences and Technology
 Credence Hospital, Ulloor
 Divya Prabha Eye Hospital
 Medical College Hospital
 Regional Cancer Centre
 Mission Hospital, Pothencode
 TB Hospital

Thrissur 
 Amala Institute of Medical Sciences, Amala Nagar
 Jubilee Mission Medical College and Research Institute, Thrissur
 Amala Ayurvedic Hospital and Research Centre, Amala Nagar

Madhya Pradesh

Bhopal 
 All India Institute of Medical Sciences Bhopal
 Gandhi Medical College, Bhopal and associated Hamidia Hospital, Kamla Nehru Hospital

Indore 
 Maharaja Yeshwantrao Hospital

Jabalpur 
 Netaji Subhash Chandra Bose Medical College, Jabalpur

Gwalior 
 Cancer Hospital & Research Centre
 Sahara Hospital

Maharashtra

Aurangabad 
 Hedgewar Hospital
 MGM Medical College and Hospital, Aurangabad

Mumbai 
 Asian Heart Institute, Bandra-Kurla Complex
 Bhabha Hospital, Bandra
 Bhaktivedanta Hospital, Mira Road
 Bombay Hospital, Marine Lines
 Breach Candy Hospital, Mahalaxmi
 D Y Patil Hospital, Nerul
 Cooper Hospital, Vile Parle
 Gokuldas Tejpal Hospital, Fort
 Grant Medical College and Sir Jamshedjee Jeejebhoy Group of Hospitals, Sandhurst Road
 Hinduja Healthcare Surgical, Khar, Mumbai
 Hinduja Hospital, Mahim, Mumbai
 Holy Family Hospital, Bandra
 Hurkisondas Hospital, Girgaon
 Jaslok Hospital, Pedar Road
 Lilavati Hospital, Bandra
 Lokmanya Tilak Hospital, Sion
 Nanavati Hospital, Vile Parle
 Prince Aly Khan Hospital, Byculla
 Rajawadi Hospital, Ghatkopar
 Saifee Hospital, Charni Road
 KEM Hospital, Parel
 Shushrusha Citizens' Co-operative Hospital, Shivaji Park, Mumbai
 Shushrusha's Suman Ramesh Tulsiani Hospital, Vikhroli, Mumbai
 Sunrise Hospital, Bhandup
 Tata Memorial Hospital, Parel
 Mahatma Gandhi Memorial Hospital, Parel

Nashik
Shree Saibaba Heart Institute And Research Centre

Pune 
 Aditya Birla Memorial Hospital
 Deenanath Mangeshkar Hospital
 Hardikar Hospital
 Jehangir Hospital
 Joshi Hospital
 Ruby Hall Clinic
 Sassoon Hospital
Sahyadri Hospital

Nagpur 
 Government Medical College and Hospital, Nagpur
 All India Institute of Medical Sciences, Nagpur
 Indira Gandhi Government Medical College, Nagpur
 N.K.P. Salve Institute of Medical Sciences Popularly known as Lata Mangeshkar Hospital, Nagpur

Wardha 
 Kasturba Hospital, Sewagram

Yavatmal 
 Shri Vasantrao Naik Government Medical College

Manipur 

Regional Institute of Medical Sciences
Jawaharlal Nehru Institute of Medical Sciences

Meghalaya 
 North Eastern Indira Gandhi Regional Institute of Health and Medical Sciences

Nagaland

Odisha

Bhubaneswar 
 All India Institute of Medical Sciences, Bhubaneswar
 AMRI Hospital
 Apollo Bhubaneswar
 KIDS Hospital
 Hi-Tech Medical College & Hospital
 Kalinga Institute of Dental Sciences
 Kalinga Institute of Medical Sciences
 Institute of Medical Sciences and Sum Hospital

Balangir 
 Bhima Bhoi Medical College and Hospital

Balasore 
 Fakir Mohan Medical College and Hospital

Baripada 
 Pandit Raghunath Murmu Medical College and Hospital

Berhampur 
 MKCG Medical College and Hospital

Cuttack 
 Srirama Chandra Bhanja Medical College and Hospital

Keonjhar 
 Dharanidhar Medical College and Hospital

Koraput 
 Saheed Laxman Nayak Medical College and Hospital

Puri 
 Shri Jagannath Medical College and Hospital

Rourkela 
 Hi-Tech Medical College & Hospital

Sambalpur 
 Veer Surendra Sai Institute of Medical Sciences and Research

Sundargarh 
 Government Medical College and Hospital, Sundargarh

Rayagada 
 Christian Hospital, Bissam Cuttack

Pondicherry 
 Aravind Eye Hospital
 Dr. Mohan’s Diabetes Specialities Centre
 Mahatma Gandhi Medical College and Research Institute, Pillaiyarkuppam
 Pondicherry Institute of Medical Sciences, Kalapet
 Rajiv Gandhi Government Women And Children's Hospital
 Jawaharlal Institute of Postgraduate Medical Education and Research
 Aarupadai Veedu Medical College
 Vinayaka Missions Medical College
 Sri Venkateswara medical College, hospital & Research Centre

Punjab

Rajasthan

Tamil Nadu

Chennai 

 Adyar Cancer Institute
 Apollo Hospitals, Greams Road
 Balaji Dental and Craniofacial Hospital
 Billroth Hospitals
 Dr. Mohan’s Diabetes Specialities Centre
 Fortis Malar Hospital
 Global Hospitals & Health City
 Government General Hospital
 Government Hospital of Thoracic Medicine
 Government Institute of Rehabilitation Medicine
 Government multi-super speciality hospital
 Government Royapettah Hospital
 Stanley Medical College and Hospital
 Hindu Mission Hospital
 Kilpauk Medical College Hospital
 Madras Medical Mission
 MIOT Hospital
 National Institute of Siddha
 Perambur railway hospital
 Regional Institute of Ophthalmology and Government Ophthalmic Hospital
 Sankara Nethralaya
 Sir Ivan Stedeford Hospital
 Sri Ramachandra Medical College and Research Institute
 Sundaram Medical Foundation (SMF Hospital), Anna Nagar
 Tamil Nadu Government Dental College and Hospital
 Voluntary Health Services

Coimbatore 
 Aravind Eye Hospital
 Dr. Mohan’s Diabetes Specialities Centre
 PSG Institute of Medical Sciences & Research
 Sankara Eye Foundation
 Sri Ramakrishna Hospital

Madurai 
 Apollo Hospitals
 Aravind Eye Hospital
 Dr. Mohan’s Diabetes Specialities Centre

Salem 
 Aravind Eye Hospital
 Vasan Eye Care Hospital
 Vinayaka Mission Hospital

Vellore 
 Sri Narayani Hospital & Research Centre Melvisharam
 Christian Medical College & Hospital
 Dr. Mohan’s Diabetes Specialities Centre, Katpadi
 Government Vellore Medical College Hospital
 Vasan Eye Care Hospital

Tiruchirappalli 
 Divisional Railway Hospital, Golden Rock

Tirunelveli 
 Adiparasakthi Hospital
 Krishna Hospital
 Shifa Hospital

Nagercoil 
 Catherine Booth Hospital
 Little Flower Hospital
 Dr. Jeyasekharan Hospital & Nursing Home

Telangana

Hyderabad 
 Krishna Institute of Medical Sciences
 Yashoda Hospitals, Malakpet, Secunderabad, Somajiguda
 Dr. Mohan’s Diabetes Specialities Centre, Domalguda & Jubilee Hills
 Durgabai Deshmukh Hospital, Vidyanagar
 Fernandez Hospital, Bogulkunta
 L. V. Prasad Eye Institute
 LifeSpring Hospitals
 National Institute of Mentally Handicapped, Newbowenpally
 Nizam's Institute of Medical Sciences, Somajiguda
 Osmania General Hospital, Afzal Gunj
 Sarojini Devi Eye Hospital, Mehidipatnam

Warangal 
 Mahatma Gandhi Memorial Hospital

Nizamabad 
 Government General Hospital, Nizamabad

Tripura 
 Tripura Medical College & Dr. B.R. Ambedkar Memorial Teaching Hospital
Agartala Government Medical College

Uttar Pradesh

Aligarh 
 Jawaharlal Nehru Medical College (AMU)
 KK Hospital

Ghaziabad 

 Manipal Hospital
 Max Super Speciality Hospital, Vaishali

Kanpur 
 Hallet Hospital
 Ganesh Shankar Vidyarthi Memorial Medical College
 Regency Hospital
 J L Rohatgi Memorial Eye Hospital
 Rama Medical College

Lucknow 
 Chhatrapati Shahuji Maharaj Medical University
 Mayo Hospital
 Sahara Hospital
 SGPGI
 Medanta Hospital
 Chandan Hospital
 Dr. Rammanohar Lohiya Institute of Medical Science

Moradabad 
 Teerthanker Mahaveer Medical College & Research Centre

Noida 

 Felix Hospital
 Fortis Hospital
 Jaypee Hospital
 Kailash Hospital
 Max Multi Speciality Centre
 Metro Hospitals & Heart Institute

Prayagraj 
 Kamla Nehru Memorial Hospital

Varanasi 
Sir Sunderlal Hospital (IMS BHU)

West Bengal

See also 
 Healthcare in India
 Indian states ranking by institutional delivery

References